This is a list of episodes of the 5-min Disney Channel American sitcom, As the Bell Rings.

Series overview 
{| class="wikitable"
|-
! style="padding: 0px 8px" rowspan="2" colspan="2" | Season
! style="padding: 0px 8px" rowspan="2" | Episodes
! style="padding: 0px 80px" colspan="2" | Originally aired (U.S. dates)
|- 
! Season premiere
! Season finale
|-
| style="background-color: #9C1E1E; color: #100; text-align: center; top" | 
| style="text-align: center; top" | [[List of As the Bell Rings (American TV series) episodes#Season 1 (2007–08)|1]]
| style="text-align: center; top" | 15
| style="text-align: center; top" | 
| style="text-align: center; top" | 
|-
| style="background-color: #99CCCC; color: #100; text-align: center; top" | 
| style="text-align: center; top" | [[List of As the Bell Rings (American TV series) episodes#Season 2 (2008–09)|2]]
| style="text-align: center; top" | 21
| style="text-align: center; top" | 
| style="text-align: center; top" |  
|}

Episode list

Season 1 (2007–08) 
 Note: The first five episodes were five minutes long. Episodes 6–15 were two minutes long.

Season 2 (2008–09) 
Demi Lovato, who played Charlotte Adams, departed from the show after season one. A new character named Lexi Adams, played by Lindsey Black, was introduced this season to replace Lovato's character.

References

Lists of American children's television series episodes
Lists of American sitcom episodes
Lists of Disney Channel television series episodes